Meolans may refer to:

 José Meolans, Argentinian freestyle swimmer
 Méolans-Revel, a commune in southeastern France
 Piedmont ringlet (scientific name Erebia meolans), a species of butterfly